Alejandro "Ale" Rodríguez Marrero (born 19 August 1994), known as Ale Pipo, is a Spanish footballer who plays as an attacking midfielder.

Club career
Born in Las Palmas, Canary Islands, Pipo played youth football for UD Las Palmas, and made his debut as a senior with the reserves in Tercera División, in 2013. In October of that year he suffered a severe knee injury, being sidelined for more than a year.

In July 2015 Pipo signed for CF Pobla de Mafumet in Segunda División B. On 2 February of the following year, after making no appearances, he signed a two-year contract with CD Tenerife B in the fourth tier.

Pipo made his first team debut on 20 August 2016, coming on as a late substitute for Aitor Sanz in a 0–1 away loss against Córdoba CF in the Segunda División championship. On 1 February of the following year he signed for another reserve team, AD Alcorcón B also in the fourth tier.

In the summer 2018, Pipo joined Algeciras CF. On 12 August 2019 the club announced, that his contract had been terminated by mutual agreement.

References

External links

1994 births
Living people
Footballers from Las Palmas
Spanish footballers
Association football midfielders
Segunda División players
Segunda División B players
Tercera División players
UD Las Palmas Atlético players
CF Pobla de Mafumet footballers
CD Tenerife B players
CD Tenerife players
AD Alcorcón B players
CF Gavà players
Algeciras CF footballers